Niwaki Dam is a concrete gravity dam located in Saga Prefecture in Japan. The dam is used for irrigation. The catchment area of the dam is 1.2 km2. The dam impounds about 9  ha of land when full and can store 600 thousand cubic meters of water. The construction of the dam was started on 1985 and completed in 1994.

References

Dams in Saga Prefecture
1994 establishments in Japan